"Stay?" is a song by the Rogue Traders, released in June 2003 as the third single from their debut album We Know What You're Up To. The single was released on two different formats, a limited edition and a standard edition.

Track listing
Promo (slipcase)
"Stay?" (radio edit)

2-track edition
"Stay?" (radio edit)
"Stay?" (Rogue Traders Bungalow Adventure)

Limited edition
"Stay?" (radio edit)
"Stay?" (Rogue Traders Bungalow Adventure)
"Stay?" (16th Element's Klub Breakfast Mix)
"One of My Kind" (Phunked Remix)
"Stay?" (16th Element's Dub Breakfast Mix)
"Stay?" (album version)

12" vinyl
A1: "Stay?" (Rogue Traders Bungalow Adventure)
A2: "Stay?" (original album mix)
B1: "Stay?" (16th Element Klub Breakfast Mix)

Charts
The single peaked at number 60 and spent three weeks in the Top 100 Singles Chart.

References

2003 singles
Rogue Traders songs
Songs written by James Ash
2002 songs